1988–89 FIS Alpine Ski Europa Cup was the 18th season of the FIS Alpine Ski Europa Cup.

Standings

Overall

Downhill

Super G

Giant Slalom

Slalom

References

External links 
 

FIS Alpine Ski Europa Cup